Conte Burica is an indigenous territory in Costa Rica.

References 

Indigenous territories of Costa Rica